Thachiledathu Chundan is a 1999 Indian Malayalam-language action drama film directed by Shajoon Karyal and written by Babu Janardhanan and produced by Thampi Kannanthanam under the banner of Jooliya Pictures. The film stars Mammootty in the lead role, along with Nandini, Thilakan, Nedumudi Venu, Captain Raju and Kaveri in supporting roles. The film revolves a boatrace fantic, Kochu Kunju. The film features original songs composed by Raveendran, with the background score done by S. P. Venkatesh. The lyrics were written by Bichu Thirumala. The film was released on 1 April 1999 on the occasion of Vishu. The film was major commercial success and went on to become the third highest grossing film of the year. The film was director Shajoon Karyal's breakthrough in Malayalam cinema.

Plot
The film is set in modern Kuttanad, Kerala, and revolves around the lives of a Vallamkali (boatrace) fanatic named Kochu Kunju (Mammootty) and his family. Kochu Kunju is a member of the most prominent family in the locality, is the kind who cares for no one. He becomes a terror in the locality and his family is forced to send him away, so that they can live in peace. He comes back to the village when he hears of the destruction of the Vallam (snakeboat), once the pride of the village, and vows not only to take revenge on the culprits, but also to rebuild the snakeboat in time for the next boat race season. On behalf of his family, Kochu Kunju challenges their rival family that they will buy a new boat for the upcoming Vallamkali. However, certain problems follows and Kochu Kunju is forced to marry a wealthy girl and forget his childhood girlfriend. After buying the boat, Kochu Kunju had to face further problems; his boatmen were attacked and he himself had to lead the boat. However, the ultimate success is for Kochu Kunju.

Cast
 Mammootty as Ashokan Nair/ Kochu Kunju 
 Nandini as Usha 
 Thilakan as Vikraman Nair
 Nedumudi Venu as Vasukutty  
 Vani Viswanath as Ambika 
 Kaveri as Indu 
 Captain Raju as Velupillai 
 Vijayakumar as Murali 
 Meghanathan as Uthaman 
 Augustine as Kamalahasan 
 Kollam Thulasi as Advocate 
 Manka Mahesh  
 Sadiq as Balachandran
 Latha
 V. K. Sriraman as Sekharan 
 Sathaar as Geevarghese 
 Azeez as Balachandran 
 Jagannathan as Raghavan Nair 
 Mohan Jose as Chenkeeri
 Kundara Johny as Thankayya Mooppan 
 Alphonse as Dancer
Anish paul as CI Balan pillai (police)

Soundtrack
The film includes songs composed by Raveendran, with lyrics by Bichu Thirumala. The background score was composed by S. P. Venkatesh.

Reception
The year 1999 was a turbulent year for Malayalam cinema, with an all-time low production of 60 films, which is low compared to films produced in 1997, which had more than a 100 films. In 1999, 45 films of the 60 films bombed at the box office, with approximately only 10 films reaping good profits. Thachiledathu Chundan was one of the few films that was successful at the box office. The film was the third highest grossing film of the year, earning 7 crore from the box office in its final run. The film was only surpassed by Friends and Pathram.

References

External links
 
 Thachiledathu Chundan at the Malayalam Movie Database

1990s Malayalam-language films
1999 drama films
1999 films
Films directed by Shajoon Kariyal
Films scored by Raveendran